Heart Condition is a 1990 American comedy film starring Bob Hoskins, Denzel Washington and Chloe Webb. Denzel Washington stars as Napoleon Stone, a lawyer, and Bob Hoskins stars as Jack Moony, a police officer. The two rivals compete in the same work force area in their community to help bring down drug rate. Their goal would be to find the mysterious men that shot and killed Napoleon Stone.

The film was released on February 2, 1990, and grossed over $4 million in the U.S. It received negative reviews from critics.

Plot

Hoskins plays police sergeant Jack Moony, a racist bigoted cop; and Washington plays Napoleon Stone, an irresistible persuader and ambulance-chasing lawyer who Moony hates. The feelings are mutual. Stone goes on to date Moony's ex-girlfriend which stirs up the pot between the two. Moony's years of bad habits, such as overeating, smoking, and drinking, finally catch up with him, risking his health and life. At the same time, Stone is killed in an apparent car accident. After suffering a heart attack, Moony wakes up to find out that his new heart was once Stone's, and the dead lawyer's ghost has become his constant companion. Stone takes on the role of a manifested ghost that needs answers to why he was shot and who committed it. He seeks to haunt Moony to help him in this quest because of the relationship they once had that will now continue. Now, Moony will have to solve Stone's murder.

Cast
 Bob Hoskins as Jack Moony
 Denzel Washington as Napoleon Stone
 Lisa Stahl Sullivan as Annie
 Chloe Webb as Crystal Gerrity
 Roger E. Mosley as Captain Wendt
 Ja'net Dubois as Mrs. Stone
 Alan Rachins as Dr. Posner
 Ray Baker as Harry Zara
 Jeffrey Meek as Graham
 Eva LaRue as Peisha
 Ron Taylor as Bubba
 Clayton Landey as Posner's Assistant

Reception
The movie's reception was largely negative, scoring a 10% approval rating on Rotten Tomatoes based on 10 reviews. Roger Ebert gave the film two stars. In 2021, Vulture ranked 47 Denzel Washington movies, with Heart Condition coming in last place at number 47.

References

External links
 
 
 
 

1990 films
1990s fantasy comedy films
American fantasy comedy films
American buddy cop films
1990s buddy cop films
1990s ghost films
1990s supernatural films
New Line Cinema films
1990 directorial debut films
1990 comedy films
American ghost films
1990s English-language films
1990s American films